"I Know You Want Me (Calle Ocho)" is a song by American rapper and singer Pitbull released as the second single from his fourth album, Pitbull Starring in Rebelution. The song samples "75, Brazil Street" by Nicola Fasano and Pat Rich, which itself samples the opening horns riff from "Street Player" by Chicago. The core is from a song by Dominican rappers El Cata and Omega. The title is a reference to Calle Ocho, a street in Miami's Little Havana neighborhood.

The song premiered on the Miami radio station WPOW. It has also been featured in Dance Central, the Xbox 360 Kinect-based dancing game, Dance Dance Revolution X2 for PlayStation 2, the PlayStation 3 PlayStation Move-based dancing game SingStar Dance, and in the pilot of Suburgatory. It received a nomination a Latin Rhythm Airplay Song of the Year at the 2010 Latin Billboard Music Awards.

Composition

"I Know You Want Me (Calle Ocho)" is an uptempo syncopated hip hop groove with clear vocals on the chorus and a pop hook while combining Eurodance synths with a tribal house-oriented beat. The song is set in common time with a moderate tempo of 127 beats per minute and is written in the key of D minor. Pitbull's vocal range spans from C4 to Bb4. The song is a vocal mix of "75, Brazil Street" by Nicola Fasano Vs Pat-Rich, which itself samples "Street Player" by Chicago.

Critical reception
The song received mixed reviews with Billboard.com editor Michael Menachem giving the single a favorable review: 

Fraser McAlpine of the BBC also favored it.  He said it was meant to be sexy given how Pitbull performed the verses, but is fun and 'more gigglesome than wrigglesome', and wondered if its effect would vary between listeners of different genders:

Chart performance
"I Know You Want Me (Calle Ocho)" is Pitbull's first single to become an international hit. The single peaked at number two on the US Billboard Hot 100 for one week, on the week of June 20, 2009. The song was Pitbull's highest-peaking single until "Give Me Everything" hit number one; it also became his third top-ten hit. The song also reached number one on the French Singles Chart and number four on the US Mainstream Top 40 radio. On November 11, 2009, the single was certified double platinum by the Recording Industry Association of America (RIAA) for sales of over two million digital copies. As of June 2011, the song has sold 3.2 million digital copies in the United States.

In the United Kingdom, the single debuted at number 53 then raising to number 28 the following week; in the third week it reached number 13 and in the fourth week, it reached number nine giving Pitbull his first top-ten single in the UK. The following week it moved up again to number seven, peaking at number four a week later. In Australia, the song peaked at number six on the Australian Singles Chart, making it his first song to hit the top 10 there, while in Spain the song reached number one and has been certified triple platinum with sales of over 120,000 units. In New Zealand, the song peaked at number three and was certified platinum, selling over 15,000 copies.

Music video
The music video was first released to YouTube on March 9, 2009 by Ultra Music and was directed by David Rousseau and produced by Alexandra Sdoucos. It features Pitbull, Nayer (wearing a peaked cap), and models Sagia Castañeda, Maria Milian, and Angelica Casañas. It has received over 286 million views even though this particular upload is not available for worldwide viewership due to licensing restrictions in certain countries.

"I Know You Want Me (Calle Ocho)" was the number one most viewed music video on YouTube in 2009. The video received 82 million views, easily beating out the second and third most viewed videos both by Disney star Miley Cyrus, "The Climb" (64 million views) and "Party in the USA" (54 million views).

The official music video version (without Ultra Music identifiers) was released onto Pitbull's official Vevo channel on May 25, 2011. It received over 3 million views even though this particular upload was not available for worldwide viewership, again due to licensing restrictions in certain countries. The video has since been removed from YouTube.

Charts

Weekly charts

Monthly charts

Year-end charts

All-time charts

Certifications

References

2009 songs
2009 singles
Pitbull (rapper) songs
Songs written by Pitbull (rapper)
Songs written by El Cata
Song recordings produced by Lil Jon
Dutch Top 40 number-one singles
European Hot 100 Singles number-one singles
Ultratop 50 Singles (Flanders) number-one singles
Ultratop 50 Singles (Wallonia) number-one singles
SNEP Top Singles number-one singles
Number-one singles in Israel
Number-one singles in Romania
Number-one singles in Russia
Number-one singles in Spain
Macaronic songs
Spanglish songs
Ultra Music singles